

Events

July 30, 1952
 The Boston Celtics signed Kenny Rollins as a free agent.

August 8, 1952
 The Milwaukee Hawks sold Cal Christensen to the Rochester Royals.

August 9, 1952
 The Milwaukee Hawks hired Andrew Levane as head coach.

September 11, 1952
The Indianapolis Olympians traded Don Lofgran to the Philadelphia Warriors for Mel Payton.

October 9, 1952
 The Baltimore Bullets traded Bill Calhoun to the Syracuse Nationals for George Ratkovicz.

November 12, 1952
 The Baltimore Bullets fired Chick Reiser as head coach.
 The Baltimore Bullets hired Clair Bee as head coach.

November 17, 1952
 The Boston Celtics sold Kleggie Hermsen to the Indianapolis Olympians.

November 19, 1952
 The Milwaukee Hawks traded Mark Workman to the Philadelphia Warriors for Don Sunderlage.

November 20, 1952
 The New York Knicks sold George Kaftan to the Baltimore Bullets.

November 24, 1952
 The Milwaukee Hawks traded Eddie Miller to the Baltimore Bullets for George Ratkovicz.

November 25, 1952
 The Syracuse Nationals sold Jim Brasco to the Milwaukee Hawks.

November 28, 1952
 The New York Knicks traded Ray Lumpp to the Baltimore Bullets for cash.
 The Philadelphia Warriors sold Andy Phillip to the Fort Wayne Pistons.

December 1, 1952
 The Baltimore Bullets sold Frank Kudelka to the Philadelphia Warriors.

December 2, 1952
 The Syracuse Nationals sold Bill Calhoun to the Milwaukee Hawks.

December 11, 1952
 The Philadelphia Warriors sold Ed Mikan to the Indianapolis Olympians.
 The New York Knicks sold Ralph Polson to the Philadelphia Warriors.

January 2, 1953
 The Milwaukee Hawks traded Don Boven, Pete Darcey and George McLeod to the Baltimore Bullets for Stan Miasek and Dave Minor.

January 14, 1953
 The Indianapolis Olympians waived Ralph O'Brien.

January 19, 1953
 The Fort Wayne Pistons claimed Ralph O'Brien on waivers from the Indianapolis Olympians.

January 20, 1953
 The Philadelphia Warriors waived Frank Kudelka.
 The Philadelphia Warriors waived Jerry Fleishman.

February 16, 1953
 The Baltimore Bullets traded Don Boven and Fred Scolari to the Fort Wayne Pistons for Jack Kerris and Ralph O'Brien.

April 7, 1953
 The New York Knicks signed Jerry Fleishman as a free agent.

May ?, 1953
 The Baltimore Bullets selected Leo Barnhorst from the Indianapolis Olympians in the dispersal draft.
 The Philadelphia Warriors selected Joe Graboski from the Indianapolis Olympians in the dispersal draft.
 The Milwaukee Hawks selected Bob Lavoy from the Indianapolis Olympians in the dispersal draft.
 The Milwaukee Hawks selected Bill Tosheff from the Indianapolis Olympians in the dispersal draft.
 The Philadelphia Warriors selected Paul Walther from the Indianapolis Olympians in the dispersal draft.

Notes
 Number of years played in the NBA prior to the draft
 Career with the franchise that drafted the player
 Never played a game for the franchise

External links
NBA Transactions at NBA.com
1952-53 NBA Transactions| Basketball-Reference.com

References

Transactions
1952-53